Prince William's Seat at , is the 296th–highest peak in Ireland on the Arderin scale, however, it does not have the elevation to quality as a Vandeleur-Lynam. Prince William's Seat is on the border of the Wicklow Mountains and Dublin Mountains in Ireland, and lies on the northern side of the Glencree valley, positioned at its entrance. Prince William's Seat is separated by a small col from neighbouring Knocknagun, which is also  in height.  Prince William's Seat and Knocknagun are popular peaks with hill-walkers.

Naming
According to Irish academic Paul Tempan, the peak was probably named after William, brother of King George IV, following a royal visit to Ireland in 1821. Tempan has not been able to find any evidence of an Irish native name prior to "Prince William's Seat" (historical maps such as Wright's Guide to the County of Wicklow (1827), simply list the area as the "Commons of Ballynulty", a local townland).

Tempan wondered whether the neighbouring peak of Knocknagun, which is of equal height and only separated by a small saddle, was the name given to both peaks. There is a granite Tor near the summit of Knocknagun, which would have served as a resting place (or "seat") for the hunting parties of the Fitzwilliam family, who owned the lands from the mid-16th century to the late 17th century.

Hill walking
Prince William's Seat is described as a popular hill walking location for families given its ease of access and proximity to Dublin City. A recommended route is the 10.5-kilometre 3-4 hour "loop route" that starts from a forest car-park at the Boranaraltry Bridge in Glencullen, rises up to the summit of Knocknagon through the Glencullen Forest, and then crosses to the summit of Prince William's Seat, before returning to the bridge.

Fitzwilliam's Seat
Near the summit of Knocknagon is a large granite Tor known as Fitzwilliam's Seat, which stands out amongst the flat boggy terrain of the area.

Bibliography

Gallery

See also

Wicklow Way
Wicklow Round
Wicklow Mountains
Lists of mountains in Ireland
List of mountains of the British Isles by height

References

External links
MountainViews: The Irish Mountain Website, Prince William's Seat
MountainViews: Irish Online Mountain Database
The Database of British and Irish Hills , the largest database of British Isles mountains ("DoBIH")
Hill Bagging UK & Ireland, the searchable interface for the DoBIH

Mountains and hills of County Wicklow
Geography of County Wicklow